Lalrinchhana Tochhawng (born 19 May 1995) is an Indian professional footballer who plays as a defender for Aizawl F.C. in the I-League and as Mizoram Captain.

Career
Tochhawng made his professional debut for Mumbai F.C. in the I-League against Dempo S.C. at the Balewadi Sports Complex in which he came on in the 84th minute for Ashutosh Mehta as Mumbai went on to draw the match 1–1.

Career statistics

References

External links 
 Mumbai Football Club Profile.

1995 births
Living people
People from Mamit

Indian footballers
Mumbai FC players
Association football midfielders
Footballers from Mizoram
I-League players
Aizawl FC players